Rhys Jones or variation, may refer to:

Given and last name
Rhys Jones (archaeologist) (1941–2001), Welsh-Australian archaeologist
Rhys Jones (rugby union) (born 1987), Welsh rugby union player
Murder of Rhys Jones, an 11-year-old shot dead in Liverpool, 2007
Rhys Jones (soldier) (born 1960), New Zealand Lieutenant General
Rhys Jones (mountaineer) (born 1986), English mountaineer
Rhys Jones (athlete) (born 1994), Paralympic athlete from Wales
Rhys Parry Jones, Welsh actor
Rhys James, English comedian who was born Rhys Jones

With a variant spelling
Reece Jones (footballer) (born 1992), Welsh footballer
Reece Jones (artist) (born 1976), British artist
Reece Jones (geographer) (born 1976), American political geographer
Rees Jones (born 1941), golf course architect

Surnamed
David Rhys-Jones (born 1962), Australian rules footballer
Sophie Rhys-Jones (born 1965), the Duchess of Edinburgh
With a variant spelling
Trevor Rees-Jones (bodyguard) (born 1968), bodyguard to Diana, Princess of Wales when she died

Part of the name 
Adam Rhys Jones (born 1981), Welsh rugby union player
Griff Rhys Jones (born 1953), British comedian
Griffith Rhys Jones (1834–1897), Welsh choir conductor

See also

 Jones (disambiguation)
 Reece (disambiguation)
 Reese (disambiguation)
 Rees (disambiguation)
 Rhees (disambiguation)
 Rhys (name)